
Gmina Mogilany is a rural gmina (administrative district) in Kraków County, Lesser Poland Voivodeship, in southern Poland.

Villages
Gmina Mogilany contains the villages and settlements of Brzyczyna, Buków, Chorowice, Gaj, Konary, Kulerzów, Libertów, Lusina, Mogilany and Włosań.

Neighbouring gminas
Gmina Mogilany is bordered by the city of Kraków and by the gminas of Myślenice, Siepraw, Skawina and Świątniki Górne.

References
 Polish official population figures 2006

External links 
 Official website for Gmina Mogilany

Mogilany
Kraków County